.py is the Internet country code top-level domain (ccTLD) for Paraguay.

Second-level domains 
 com.py
 coop.py
 edu.py
 mil.py
 gov.py
 org.py
 net.py
 una.py

External links 
 .py Registrar
 IANA .py whois information
 http://www.nic.py/ - Network Information Center Paraguay

Country code top-level domains
Communications in Paraguay

sv:Toppdomän#P